Autosticha deductella is a moth in the family Autostichidae. It was described by Francis Walker in 1864. It is found in Sri Lanka.

Adults are brown, the forewings without markings, rounded at the tips and the exterior border almost straight, slightly oblique.

References

Moths described in 1864
Autosticha
Moths of Asia